18 is a 1993 Taiwanese experimental film directed by Ho Ping, written by Ho Ping and Kuo Cheng, based on Kuo Cheng's 1991 short story "God's Dice" (上帝的骰子).

The title refers to a popular Taiwanese gambling game played with 4 dice in a rice bowl, with the highest combination (called "18") containing 2 sixes and 2 of any identical number not six (i.e. 1166, 2266, 3366, 4466, and 5566).

Cast
 Wu Hsing-kuo as "Weirdo", probably a second-generation immigrant from mainland China who is a little confused about his identity.
 Lin Chi-lou as Weirdo's wife.
 Lin Chia-chen as Weirdo's young daughter who is too mature for her age.
 Lu Hsiao-fen as Mingzhu, a convenience store owner.
 Lu Hsiao-fen as Ah Kiu, a hotel owner.
 Tou Chung-hua as Ah Hai.
 Chen Hui-lou as Ah Kiu's old husband who came from mainland China around 1949.
 Sze Yu as Wu Sheng, an illegal immigrant from mainland China.

Awards and nominations

The film won International Federation of Film Critics Prize during the 1993 Thessaloniki International Film Festival in Thessaloniki, Greece.

External links
 

Films directed by Ho Ping
Hokkien-language films
1990s Mandarin-language films
Films with screenplays by Kuo Cheng
Films shot in Taiwan
Films set in Taiwan
1990s avant-garde and experimental films
Taiwanese avant-garde and experimental films